Hoffman Corners is an unincorporated community in the towns of Cottage Grove and Pleasant Springs, Dane County, Wisconsin, United States. Hoffman Corners was named for its first postmaster, Gilbert Hoffman, who opened the community's post office in 1857.

References

Unincorporated communities in Dane County, Wisconsin
Unincorporated communities in Wisconsin